"Good Time" is a song by Swiss musicians Luca Hänni and DJ Christopher S. It was written by Mathias Ramson, Michael Keller and Michel Lüchinger and produced by the latter for Hänni's third studio album Dance Until We Die (2014). The song was released as the album's second single on 13 June 2014. It became the album's second consecutive top thirty entry when it peaked at number 28 on the Swiss Singles Chart.

Music video
A music video to accompany the release of "Good Time" was first released onto YouTube on 17 June 2014 at a total length of three minutes and twenty-nine seconds.

Track listing

Charts

Release history

References

2014 singles
2014 songs
Luca Hänni songs